Grosvenor may refer to:

People 
 Grosvenor (surname)
 Hugh Grosvenor, 7th Duke of Westminster
 Grosvenor Francis (1873–1944), Australian politician
 Grosvenor Hodgkinson (1818–1881), English lawyer and politician
 Gilbert Hovey Grosvenor (1875-1966), photojournalist and the first full-time editor of the National Geographic magazine

Places, buildings and structures 
 Grosvenor Park (disambiguation)
 Grosvenor Place (disambiguation)

London, England
 Grosvenor Bridge
 Grosvenor Canal
 Grosvenor Chapel
 Grosvenor Crescent
 Grosvenor Gallery
 Grosvenor House
 Grosvenor House Hotel
 Grosvenor School of Modern Art
 Grosvenor Square

In Chester, England
 Grosvenor Bridge (Chester)
 Grosvenor Museum
 Grosvenor Rowing Club
 Grosvenor Shopping Centre
 Chester Grosvenor and Spa

Elsewhere
 Grosvenor Arch, Utah, United States
 Grosvenor Centre, Northampton, England
 Grosvenor Chambers, Melbourne, Australia
 Grosvenor Grammar School, Belfast, Northern Ireland
 Grosvenor House (Dubai), United Arab Emirates
 Grosvenor Island, Nunavut, Canada
 Grosvenor Mountains, Antarctica
 Grosvenor Resort, Florida, United States
 Grosvenor Road, South Shields, England
 Grosvenor–Strathmore (WMATA station), Washington, D.C., United States
 Grosvenor Street, Sydney, Australia
 Port Grosvenor, South Africa
 Grosvenor, an electoral ward to Wrexham County Borough Council, Wales
 Grosvenor Street, Melbourne, Australia

Other 
 Grosvenor (East Indiaman), wrecked 1782 on the South African coast
 The Wreck of the Grosvenor, 1877 novel by W. Clark Russell.  No connection with the actual 1782 wreck of the Grosvenor (see above).
 Grosvenor Capital Management
 Grosvenor gambit or coup, a psychological play in the game of contract bridge
 Grosvenor Group
 Grosvenor Casinos
 Siraitia grosvenorii

See also 
 Grovenor, Edmonton, Alberta, Canada